Portrait of the Count-Duke of Olivares may refer to
Equestrian portrait of Duke de Olivares
Portrait of the Count-Duke of Olivares (Hermitage)
Portrait of the Count-Duke of Olivares (São Paulo)